Alec Regis Shellogg (February 17, 1914 – July 12, 1968) was a professional American football player in the National Football League as well as the third American Football League. In 1939, he played in the NFL for the Chicago Bears and the Brooklyn Dodgers. In 1940 and 1941 he played in the AFL for the Buffalo Indians/Tigers. He earned all-AFL honors both years in the league. He was also one of over 1,000 NFL personnel who served in the military during World War II.

Prior to his professional career, Shellogg played at the college level while attending Notre Dame. He was a two-time letterman in 1936 and 1937. He was even elected captain of the 1938 Notre Dame team.

He died on July 12, 1968 of a heart attack.

References

 Bills Backers: History of Pro Football in Western New York, 1941 Buffalo Tigers
Football and America: WW II Honor Roll
University of Notre Dame All-Time Line-ups

1914 births
1968 deaths
Players of American football from Pennsylvania
Chicago Bears players
Brooklyn Dodgers (NFL) players
Buffalo Indians players
Buffalo Tigers players
Notre Dame Fighting Irish football players